Cécile Le Bailly is a French actress. In 1980 she starred in Le Voyage en douce, directed by Michel Deville.

Selected filmography 
L'enfant secret (1979)
Le Voyage en douce (1980)
Heroes Shed No Tears (1986)

References

External links

French film actresses
Living people
21st-century French actresses
Year of birth missing (living people)
Place of birth missing (living people)